Taro dumpling is a variety of dim sum served within Chinese cuisine. It is a standard dish in dim sum restaurants in Hong Kong and around the world. Among overseas Chinatowns, it is often sold as a Chinese pastry. It is also known as taro croquette, deep fried taro dumpling, deep fried taro dumpling puff, or simply taro dumpling 

The outer shell is made from a thick layer of taro that has been boiled and mashed. The filling is made from seasoned ground pork. The dumpling is deep fried, and the outermost layer of taro becomes crisp, light, and fluffy.

See also 
 Dim sum
 Spring roll
 Taro cake

References

Dim sum
Cantonese cuisine
Hong Kong cuisine
Pork dishes
Dumplings
Deep fried foods
Taro dishes